Mój Świat is the debut studio album by Polish singer-songwriter Piotr Karpienia featuring Polish composer Witold Cisło. It is set for release on 15 May 2012 under Sony Music Poland. The album will be promoted with the first single called "Zagubiona".

Track listing

References

2012 albums
Sony Music Poland albums